Resurrecting: The Street Walker is a 2009 British horror film written and directed by Özgür Uyanık. Its plot concerns an ambitious young filmmaker who discovers an abandoned and incomplete horror movie from the 1980s and decides to finish it. The film premiered at the 2009 Raindance Film Festival where it was nominated Best UK Feature and was selected for the Istanbul International Film Festival and the 16th London Turkish Film Festival, amongst others.

Release

Festival screenings
 2009 Raindance Film Festival (30 September – 11 October 2009)
 16th London Turkish Film Festival (4–18 November 2010)

See also
 2009 in film
 British films of 2009

References

External links
 
 

2009 films
British horror films
2009 horror films
2000s English-language films
2000s British films